Born Again is the first posthumous compilation album by American rapper the Notorious B.I.G., released by Bad Boy Records and Arista Records on December 7, 1999. It is composed primarily of early recorded verses with newer beats and guest rappers.

The album debuted at #1 on the Billboard 200 chart with 485,000 albums sold in the first week, and was certified 2× Platinum by the RIAA on January 14, 2000 and has sold over 2,350,000 copies in the United States. Born Again received generally mixed reviews from music critics.

Critical reception

The album generally received mixed reviews from critics. In a contemporary review for Rolling Stone, Touré wrote that the "album won't damage his legacy. But Born Again won't improve that legacy much, either." Rob Sheffield later wrote in The Rolling Stone Album Guide, "the posthumous Born Again proved Biggie was still dead, but his place in the MCs Hall of Fame remains untouchable." Robert Christgau, who gave the release a "dud" rating, later wrote, "Remember that posthumous outtakes CD Bad Boy attributed to Biggie? No? Good then—it was foul, not just ill shit but stupid ill shit."

Track listing
Credits adapted from the album's liner notes.

Notes
 signifies a co-producer
 signifies an additional producer
 signifies a vocal producer
 signifies the original producer

Sample credits
 "Notorious B.I.G." contains samples of "Notorious", written by John Taylor, Nicholas Bates, and Simon LeBon; performed by Duran Duran.
 "Biggie" contains samples of "Hang Your Head in Shame", written by Wes Farrell and John Bahler, performed by New York City.
 "Dead Wrong" contains a sample of "I'm Glad You're Mine", written and performed by Al Green.
 "Big Booty Hoes" contains samples of "Crab Apple" written by David Mathews, performed by Idris Muhammad. It also contains samples of "Bust a Nut", written by Luther Campbell, Christopher Wallace, |Frankie Cutlass and Allen Toussaint; performed by Luke.
 "Come On" contains samples of "For Mama", written by Charles Aznavour, Don Black, and Robert Gall; performed by Doc Severinsen. It also contains re-sung elements of "Theme from Mahogany", written by Gerry Goffin and Michael Masser.
 "Rap Phenomenon" contains samples of "Keep Your Hands High", written by Thom Bell, Roland Chambers, Kenneth Gamble, Ike Lee, Tracey Lee, and Christopher Wallace; performed by Tracey Lee.
 "Let Me Get Down" contains samples of "Love Serenade", written and performed by Barry White.
 "Tonight" contains samples of "Just Say Just Say", written by Nickolas Ashford and Valerie Simpson, performed by Diana Ross and Marvin Gaye.
 "Who Shot Ya" contains samples of "I'm Afraid the Masquerade is Over", written by Allie Wrubel and Herbert Magidson, performed by David Porter.
 "Can I Get Witcha" contains samples of "Livin' It Up (Friday Night)", written and performed by Bell and James.
 "I Really Want to Show You" contains samples of "Charisma", written by Ed Fox and Alan Scott, performed by Tom Browne.

Charts

Weekly charts

Year-end charts

Certifications

See also
 List of number-one albums of 1999 (U.S.)
 List of number-one R&B albums of 1999 (U.S.)

References

The Notorious B.I.G. albums
1999 albums
Albums published posthumously
Bad Boy Records albums
Arista Records albums
Albums produced by Sean Combs
Albums produced by DJ Premier
Albums produced by Mannie Fresh
Albums produced by Nottz